Nesta  is a genus of sea snails, marine gastropod mollusks in the family Fissurellidae, the keyhole limpets.

This genus has become a synonym for Zeidora A. Adams, 1860

Species
Species within the genus Nesta  include:
Nesta amamiensis Habe, 1963
 Species brought into synonymy
Nesta atlantica Pérez Farfante, 1947: synonym of Laevinesta atlantica (Pérez Farfante, 1947)
Nesta candida Adams, 1870: synonym of Zeidora candida (Adams, 1870)
Nesta galapagensis McLean, 1970: synonym of Zeidora galapagensis (McLean, 1970)

References

Fissurellidae